Viper Falcon is the designation of an American sounding rocket. The Viper Falcon program was started in 1960.

External links
 Viper Falcon

Sounding rockets of the United States